Juanpis González: The Series is a Colombian web series sitcom starring comedian . It is based on the fictional character created by Riaño on various social media platforms, Juanpis González. The first season consists of 10 episodes, which were released on the 19th of January, 2022.

Cast 

  as Juanpis González or Juan Pablo
 Carolina Gaitán as Camila Benavides
  as Luis Carlos Pombo
 Julian Caicedo as Iván
  as María Cristina Pombo
  as Pepe Robayo

Episodes

References 

Web series